The Little Bather, is a French comedy film from 1968, directed and written by Robert Dhéry, starring Louis de Funès and Andréa Parisy.

Cast 
 Louis de Funès : Louis-Philippe Fourchaume
 Robert Dhéry : André Castagnier
 Andréa Parisy : Marie-Beatrice Fourchaume, spouse of Louis-Philippe
 Colette Brosset : Charlotte Castagnier, sister of André
 Franco Fabrizi : Marcello Cacciaperotti
 Jacques Legras : L'abbé Henri Castagnier, a brother of André
 Michel Galabru : Scipion, the brother-in-low of André
 Pierre Tornade : Jean-Baptiste Castagnier, a brother of André
 Henri Génès : Joseph
 Roger Caccia : Rémi Vigoret (the churchwarden organist)
 Pierre Dac : minister
 Robert Rollis : Sailor

Reception

The film was the highest-grossing in France in 1968.

References

External links 
 
 Le Petit Baigneur at the Films de France

1968 films
1968 comedy films
French comedy films
Commedia all'italiana
1960s French-language films
Films produced by Robert Dorfmann
Films scored by Gérard Calvi
1960s French films
1960s Italian films